Eleni Randou or Helen Rantou is a Greek actress. She was born in 1963 in Egaleo, an Athens suburb, and is a graduate of the National Theater of Greece. She initially participated in TV shows of the Greek national television in the '80s, and rose to stardom through TV series in which she co-starred and in many cases co-edited the script. She is married to Greek rock star Vasilis Papakonstantinou. Their daughter Nikoleta was born in 1995. She is currently head of the "Diana" theater. In 2009 she prepared a new comedy show in "Diana" theater that later continued as a TV comedy series Ergazomeni Gynaika.

Early career
Her TV debut was in 1983, when she was 20 years old, through the TV show "Ouranio Toxo"(Rainbow) in which she had a starring role. In the same year she also appeared in the TV show "I Kiria Ntoremi" with the role of "Eleftheria".
In 1984 she participated in the TV show "Paramithia piso apo ta kagkela" and in 1985 in the tV show "Xaire Taso Karataso. In 1987 she appeared in "Apodrasi" and the next year in the TV show "Stavrosi horis anastasi".

Filmography
TV series:

1983: Ouranio toxo, ERT
1988-1989: Odos antheon, ET1
1988: Stavrosi xoris anastasi, ET1
1990-1992: Ohi ta nea tou ANT1, ANT1
1992-1993: Ah Eleni, MEGA
1995-1996: Sambouan, ANT1
1998-2000: Konstantinou kai Elenis, ANT1
2000: Ti Psyhi Tha Paradoseis Mori?, MEGA
2003-2004: Savatogennimenes, MEGA
2009–2010: Ergazomeni Gynaika, ANT1

Theatre:

2000-2002: Mageirevontas me ton Elvis
2002-2005: Mama min treheis
2005: Eklissiazouses
2005-2006: Alli mia votka molotof
2006-2008: Nyhta radio...fonon
2009-2010: 33 Fores na figeis
2011-2014: Katadikos mou

Cinema:

2009:Pethainw gia sena

External links
 Official Fan Club

1963 births
Actresses from Athens
Living people
Greek actresses
Greek comedians